Giancarlo Bucchetti (born 25 August 1925) was an Italian ice hockey player. He competed in the men's tournament at the 1948 Winter Olympics.

References

External links
 

1925 births
Possibly living people
Olympic ice hockey players of Italy
Ice hockey players at the 1948 Winter Olympics
Ice hockey people from Milan